Castle Museum may refer to:

Castle Museum (Saginaw, Michigan) in Saginaw, Michigan
York Castle Museum in York, England
Castle Museum, Norwich, England